Elizabeth Stuart (28 December 1635 – 8 September 1650) was the second daughter of Charles I, King of England, Scotland and Ireland, and his wife, Henrietta Maria of France.

From age six until her death at age 14, Elizabeth was a prisoner of the English Parliament during the English Civil War. Her emotional written account of her final meeting with her father on the eve of his execution and his final words to his children have been published in numerous histories about the Civil War and Charles I.

Failed betrothal

Elizabeth was born on 28 December 1635 at St James's Palace and was baptised there five days later, on 2 January, by William Laud, Archbishop of Canterbury. In 1636, Maria de' Medici, Elizabeth's maternal grandmother, attempted to have the infant princess betrothed to the son of the Prince of Orange, the future William II of Orange. Despite the fact that Charles I thought the marriage of an English princess to a Prince of Orange beneath her rank, the king's financial and political troubles forced him to send Elizabeth's sister, Mary, Princess Royal, to marry him instead.

Civil war
 On the outbreak of the English Civil War in 1642, Elizabeth, and her brother, the Duke of Gloucester, were placed under the care of Parliament. Over the coming years, Parliament assigned their guardianships to several nobles, among them Philip Herbert, 4th Earl of Pembroke.

In 1642, Parliament assigned guardianship of Elizabeth and Henry to the Earl of Northumberland. That same year, their brother, James, Duke of York, the future James II, came to visit them. However, Elizabeth supposedly advised him to leave out of concern about their enemies.

In 1643, the seven-year-old Elizabeth broke her leg. That same year, she and Henry moved to Chelsea. She was tutored by Bathsua Makin until 1644. By then, Elizabeth could read and write in Hebrew, Greek, Italian, Latin and French. Other prominent scholars dedicated works to her, and were amazed by her flair for religious reading.

In 1647, Parliament allowed Elizabeth and her brothers Henry and James to travel to Maidenhead to meet their father Charles I and spent two days with him. After the Parliament moved Charles I to Hampton Court Palace, he visited his children under the care of the Northumberlands at Syon House. These visits ended when he fled to Carisbrooke Castle on the Isle of Wight; ten-year-old Elizabeth supposedly helped James to escape once again, dressed as a woman.

Elizabeth's family called her "Temperance" for her kind nature. When she was eleven, the French ambassador described Elizabeth as a "budding young beauty" who had "grace, dignity, intelligence and sensibility" that enabled her to judge the different people she met and understand different points of view. Elizabeth suffered from poor health. A Victorian-era examination of her remains revealed that she had suffered from rickets, which caused shoulder and back deformities, knock knees and pigeon toes. These problems would have made it difficult for Elizabeth to walk. The adolescent Elizabeth had a long face with a protruding jaw and reddish-brown hair.

When Parliament decided to remove Elizabeth's household in 1648, the 12-year-old princess wrote them a letter protesting their decision: "My Lords, I account myself very miserable that I must have my servants taken from me and strangers put to me. You promised me that you would have a care for me; and I hope you will show it in preventing so great a grief as this would be to me. I pray my lords consider of it, and give me cause to thank you, and to rest. Your loving friend, Elizabeth." The Lords were sympathetic to Elizabeth's plight and condemned the Commons for intervening with the Royal Household, and overturned the decision. However, the Commons demanded that the royal children be brought up as strict Protestants; they were also forbidden to join the Court at Oxford, and were held virtual prisoners at St. James's Palace. At one point, Parliament considered making Henry a replacement king, but strictly a constitutional monarch.

Execution of Charles I
In 1649, Charles I was captured for the final time. Oliver Cromwell and the other judges immediately sentenced him to death. Elizabeth wrote a long letter to Parliament requesting permission to join her sister Mary in Holland. However, Parliament refused to grant this request until after the execution.

On 29 January 1649, thirteen-year-old Elizabeth and Henry met with their father for the last time. She wrote an account of the meeting: "He told me he was glad I was come, and although he had not time to say much, yet somewhat he had to say to me which he had not to another, or leave in writing, because he feared their cruelty was such as that they would not have permitted him to write to me.

"Elizabeth was reportedly crying so hard that Charles I asked her if she would be able to remember everything he told her. She promised never to forget and said she would record it in writing. She wrote two separate accounts of the meeting. Her father told her not to "grieve and torment herself for him" and asked her to keep her faith in the Protestant religion. Charles I told her to read certain books, among them Bishop Andrew's Sermons, Hooker's Ecclesiastical Polity and Bishop Laud's book against Fisher, to ground her against "popery".
 Charles I also gave his daughter a Bible during the meeting.

After the death of Charles I, Elizabeth and Henry became unwanted charges. Joceline, Lord Lisle, the Earl of Northumberland's son, petitioned Parliament to remove Elizabeth and Henry from the Northumberlands' care. Parliament refused to allow them to go to Holland, and instead placed the children in the care of Sir Edward Harrington; however, Harrington's son successfully pleaded that they be looked after elsewhere.

Commonwealth
The next residence for Elizabeth and Henry was Penshurst Place, under the care of Robert Sidney, 2nd Earl of Leicester, and his wife Dorothy. Parliament had instructed the Sidneys not to spoil the children. However, Dorothy Sidney treated Elizabeth with great kindness; as a token of her appreciation, Elizabeth gave Dorothy a jewel from her own collection. The valuable jewel later became the centre of conflict between Dorothy and the Parliamentary commissioners appointed to oversee the late king's personal estate.

In 1650, Elizabeth's brother, the now titular Charles II, journeyed to Scotland to be crowned king of that country. In response, Parliament moved Elizabeth to the Isle of Wight in the care of Anthony Mildmay with a pension of £3000 a year. Elizabeth complained that she was not well enough to travel, but her concerns were ignored.

Death
During the move to the Isle of Wight, Elizabeth caught a cold that quickly developed into pneumonia. She died on 8 September 1650, at Carisbrooke Castle.

Some accounts say that Elizabeth was found dead with her head on the Bible from her father. In her last days, she was described as a sad child by those who had been around her. Three days after she was found dead, the Council of State granted permission for Elizabeth to join her sister Mary in the Netherlands. She was buried at St. Thomas's Church, Newport, on the Isle of Wight. Elizabeth's grave stone was only marked with the initials "ES" for Elizabeth Stuart.

Two hundred years later, Queen Victoria, who had settled at Osborne House nearby, commissioned a white marble sculpture of Elizabeth by the sculptor Carlo Marochetti. The sculpture depicts Elizabeth as a beautiful young woman, lying with her cheek on a Bible. The Bible is open to words from the Gospel of Matthew: "Come unto Me, all ye that labor and are heavy laden, and I will give you rest." Above the sculpture is a grating, indicating that Elizabeth was a prisoner; however, the bars are broken to show that the prisoner has now escaped to "a greater rest." The plaque on the sculpture reads: "To the memory of The Princess Elizabeth, daughter of King Charles I, who died at Carisbrooke Castle on 8 September 1650, and is interred beneath the chancel of this church, this monument is erected as a token of respect for her virtues and of sympathy for her misfortunes, by Victoria R., 1856."

The concluding lines from The Death of The Princess Elizabeth in the 1866 book Lays of the English Cavaliers by John Jeremiah Daniel commemorated Victoria's actions:

Ancestors

Notes

References

 Green, M. A. E. Lives of the Princesses of England (1849–1855)
 Goodwin, Gordon (2004) "Princess Elizabeth (1635–1650)", Oxford Dictionary of National Biography 
 

1635 births
1650 deaths
17th-century Scottish people
17th-century English women
17th-century English people
English princesses
Scottish princesses
English people of Scottish descent
Women in the English Civil War
Deaths from pneumonia in England
Children of Charles I of England
Royalty and nobility who died as children
Daughters of kings